The Mitsubishi Galant VR-4 (Viscous Realtime 4WD) was the range-topping version of Mitsubishi Motors' Galant model, available in the sixth (1987–93), seventh (1993–96) and eighth (1996–2002) generations of the vehicle. Originally introduced to comply with the new Group A regulations of the World Rally Championship, it was soon superseded as Mitsubishi's competition vehicle by the Lancer Evolution, and subsequently developed into a high-performance showcase of the company's technology.

Background and competition history
Throughout the 1970s and 1980s, Mitsubishi Motors Corporation (MMC) sought to improve its image through the established path of participation in motorsport. The Lancer 1600 GSR and Pajero/Montero/Shogun both achieved great success in rallying and rally raid events, and eventually the company planned an attempt on the Group B class of the World Rally Championship with a four-wheel drive version of its Starion coupé. However, the class was outlawed following several fatal accidents in 1985 and '86, and Mitsubishi was forced to reassess its approach. It instead homologated the recently introduced sixth generation of its Galant sedan for the Group A class, using the mechanical underpinnings from its aborted Starion prototype. Between 1988 and '92, it was campaigned by the official factory outfit, Mitsubishi Ralliart Europe, winning three events in the hands of Mikael Ericsson (1989 1000 Lakes Rally), Pentti Airikkala (1989 Lombard RAC Rally) and Kenneth Eriksson (1991 Swedish Rally). It was also driven to outright victory in the Asia-Pacific Rally Championships by Kenjiro Shinozuka (1988) and Ross Dunkerton (1991–92), and the American National GT Championship (1992) by Tim O'Neil.

However, Mitsubishi — and their competitors — realised that the WRC cars of the '80s were simply too big and ungainly for the tight, winding roads of rally stages. Sometime around 1992, Ford migrated the Sierra/Sapphire Cosworth to a smaller Escort-based bodyshell; Subaru developed the Impreza to succeed their Legacy; Toyota eventually replaced the Celica coupe with the Corolla; and Korea's Hyundai migrated their front-wheel drive Coupe-based rally car to a smaller 3-door Accent hatchback-based bodyshell in 1999. Mitsubishi, meanwhile, carried the VR-4's engine/transmission over to the new Lancer Evolution, bringing to an end the Galant's representation in MMC's motorsport efforts.

WRC victories

{|class="wikitable" style="font-size: 95%; "
! No.
! Event
! Season
! Driver
! Co-driver
|-
| 1
|  39th 1000 Lakes Rally
| 1989
|  Mikael Ericsson
|  Claes Billstam
|-
| 2
|  38th Lombard RAC Rally
| 1989
|  Pentti Airikkala
|  Ronan McNamee
|-
| 3
|  22ème Rallye Côte d'Ivoire Bandama
| 1990
|  Patrick Tauziac
|  Claude Papin
|-
| 4
|  40th International Swedish Rally
| 1991
|  Kenneth Eriksson
|  Staffan Parmander
|-
| 5
|  23ème Rallye Côte d'Ivoire Bandama
| 1991
|  Kenjiro Shinozuka
|  John Meadows
|-
| 6
|  24ème Rallye Côte d'Ivoire Bandama
| 1992
|  Kenjiro Shinozuka
|  John Meadows
|-
|}

Sixth generation (E38A/E39A)

Group A regulations dictated a turbocharged engine of 2.0 L displacement and a four-wheel drive transmission. In order to satisfy the mandatory minimum sales requirements of 5,000 units, Mitsubishi made it available in North America, New Zealand, Australia, Japan, and other Asian Pacific Rim territories, with 2,000 reaching the United States in 1991, and 1000 units imported in 1992. It also satisfied Japanese regulations concerning external dimensions and engine displacement, thereby reducing a sales handicap in Japan with regards to additional taxes paid by Japanese owners. This car also featured power-assisted speed-sensitive four-wheel steering: the rear wheels steered in the same phase as the front wheels above , up to 1.5 degrees.

A liftback version was also produced, known as the Eterna ZR-4. This had some minor cosmetic differences, but mechanically was the same as the VR-4 sedan. And also there are some special trim levels introduced, included VR-4 R (1987), VR-4 RS (1988), Super VR-4 (1990), VR-4 Monte Carlo (1990) and VR-4 Armed by Ralliart (1991).

Mitsubishi developed its first high performance four-wheel drive vehicle in 1987, when it equipped the Galant VR-4 with "Dynamic Four" (Mitsubishi AWC), which featured a center differential-type full-time four-wheel drive system (this system incorporated a viscous coupling unit), a four wheel steering system, four-wheel independent suspension, and a four-wheel ABS (the first total integration of these systems in the world that were highly advanced at the time).

Technical specifications
Engine
Configuration — DOHC 16-valve inline 4-cylinder
Code — 4G63T
Bore/stroke, capacity — 85.0 x 88.0 mm, 1997 cc
Compression ratio — 7.8:1
Fuelling — ECI-MULTI, premium unleaded fuel
Peak power —  at 6000 rpm
Peak torque —  at 3500 rpm
Transmission — 4-speed auto / 5-speed manual
Suspension — MacPherson struts (front), multi-link (rear)
Dimensions
Length — 
Width — 
Height — 
Wheelbase — 
Kerb weight — 
Fuel tank — 62 L
Wheels/tyres — 195/60 R15 86H

Seventh generation (E84A/E74A) 

For 1992, the emergence of the homologated Lancer Evolution meant that the top-spec Galant VR-4 was no longer constrained by sporting regulations. The new generation thus became a less overtly competition oriented vehicle. The existing, proven 4WD transmission was carried over, in keeping with Mitsubishi's reputation for performance-enhancing technology, but the old inline-four was superseded by a smoother twin-turbo 2.0-litre V6, and mated either to a conventional five-speed manual, or a four-speed INVECS auto complete with "fuzzy logic", which allowed the transmission to adapt to the driver's style and road conditions "on the fly".

Variants of the VR-4 using the same engine and drivetrain were sold in Japan as the Eterna XX-4 liftback (1992) and Galant Sports GT liftback (1994–96) and the Evo 3 1994.

Technical specifications
Engine
Configuration – DOHC 24-valve V type 6-cylinder
Code — 6A12TT
Bore/stroke, capacity – 78.4 x 69.0 mm, 1998 cc
Compression ratio – 8.5:1
Fuelling – ECI-MULTI, premium unleaded fuel
Peak power –  at 6000 rpm ( for the automatic variant)
Peak torque –  at 3500 rpm
Suspension – Multi-link (front & rear)
Wheels/tyres – 205/60 R15 91Vβ̞

Eighth generation (EC5A/EC5W)

The final VR-4 (Viscous Realtime Four Wheel Drive) was introduced in 1996. The car was now capable of over  when derestricted, and could accelerate from 0–60 mph (0–96 km/h) in 5.3 seconds for the 5-speed manual and 5.7 seconds for the 5-speed INVECS-II Auto, which was now an advanced self-learning automatic based on Porsche's Tiptronic transmission.

With the eighth generation of the Galant, Mitsubishi introduced a station wagon (known in many markets as the Legnum) to replace the old 5-door hatchback, and the VR-4 was now available in both body styles.

Mitsubishi Galant VR-4 Type V
The Type V Eighth generation was introduced to the line up as the base model VR-4 in the manual configuration and due to the popularity of the car,The Mitsubishi Galant VR-4 Type V shared the same engine as all the other eighth generation variants, twin turbo V6 6A13 and was offered in both manual and automatic transmissions. The type V never came with AYC (active yaw control)

Mitsubishi Galant VR-4 Type S
The Type S eighth generation was originally introduced with manual and INVECS-II from 1996 to 1998 and the facelift (1998-2002) was only offered in INVECS-II automatic and was thus marginally slower than a manual optioned Type V. To combat this many extras were included on the car to increase performance, such as Active Yaw Control (AYC), Traction Control Logic (TCL)and Active Stability control (ASC). The most notable difference is the flared guards of the Type S to fit the wider tyres offered to the automatic only. While the automatic was still slower than the manual by 4 tenths when measuring 0-100 times, the automatic Mitsubishi had manufactured was very sophisticated and offered much more similar performance between manual and automatic models than many other cars of the time.

Eighth generation (EC5A/EC5W) continued
All of the variants for the pre-facelift model offered the Active Yaw Control (AYC). This complex rear diff was first seen on the Lancer Evolution IV, and used an array of sensors to detect and quell oversteer, giving the ultimate VR-4 great agility for a vehicle of its size and weight.

The Super VR-4 trim level from this model was based on the pre-facelift Type-S and sold only in January 1998 on both the Galant sedan and the Legnum wagon, with a limited run of approximately 800 units. Only available in two colors, Redma, a bright red and Hamilton Silver. There are some cosmetic changes for the interior such as Recaro front seats and Momo steering wheel.

The facelift model was introduced in August 1998. The Recaro front seats and Momo steering wheel from the Super VR-4 could be optioned on all models. The ASC and TCL system was now optional on the automatic variants rather than included. The Type-S remained INVECS-II automatic only for the Galant sedan but manual could be available for the Legnum wagon from May 1999, along with the flared guards. 

North America and Europe were again denied this model which was originally planned to be exclusively for the Japanese domestic market, much like the Nissan Skyline GTR but the burgeoning grey import trade meant that it developed a cult following in several overseas territories, especially United Kingdom, New Zealand and Australia. This model also sold in Hong Kong by grey import and official dealer (only Galant VR-4s with INVECS-II were officially imported). In 2000 MMC's motorsport partner Ralliart was contracted to type-approve Galants and Lancers for UK sales, and 200 VR-4s were officially imported before production finally ceased two years later due to the revision of vehicle emission standards in Japan.

Technical specifications
Engine
Configuration — DOHC 24-valve V type 6-cylinder
Code — 6A13TT
Bore/stroke, capacity — 81.0 × 80.8 mm, 2498 cc
Compression ratio — 8.5:1
Fuelling — ECI-MULTI, premium unleaded fuel
Peak power —  at 5500 rpm ( for the pre-facelift automatic variant)
Peak torque —  at 4000 rpm ( for the pre-facelift automatic variant)
Transmission — 5-speed automatic / 5-speed manual
Suspension — Multi-link (front & rear)
Dimensions
Length — 
Width — 
Height — 
Wheelbase — 
Curb weight — 
Fuel tank — 60 L
Wheels/tyres — 205/55 R16 91V (225/50 R16 91V for the facelifted Type-S)

References

External links
 Galant 1988–1990 VR-4 at Mitsubishi Motors Web Museum
 Galant 1991–1992 VR-4 at Mitsubishi Motors Web Museum
 Technical specifications
 History of the 8th Generation VR-4
 technical Details and Information about Legnum VR4 & Galant VR4

Galant VR-4
Sports sedans
Station wagons
All-wheel-drive vehicles
Vehicles with four-wheel steering
Rally cars
1980s cars
1990s cars
2000s cars